Tor (Þor) is a Nordic masculine given name derived from the name of the Norse god Thor. It may refer to
Tor Ahlsand (born 1931), Norwegian Olympic rower
Tor Albert Ersdal (born 1972), Norwegian Olympic rower
Tor Arneberg (1928–2015), Norwegian Olympic sailor
Tor Arne Andreassen (born 1983), Norwegian association football player 
Tor Burman (1921–1995), Swedish Olympic equestrian 
Tor Egil Horn (born 1976), Norwegian football goalkeeper 
Tor Egil Kreken (born 1977), Norwegian musician
Tor Endresen (born 1959), Norwegian singer
Tor Røste Fossen (1940–2017), Norwegian football coach
Tor Graves (born 1972), Thai racing driver
Tor Gundersen (1935–2012), Norwegian Olympic ice hockey player
Tor Gustafsson Brookes (born 1997 or 1998), Australian far-right streamer
Tor Håkon Holte (born 1958), Norwegian Olympic cross-country skier
Tor Halvorsen (1930–1987), Norwegian politician
Tor Heiestad (born 1962), Norwegian Olympic shooter
Tor Helge Eikeland (born 1960), Norwegian Olympic ice hockey player
Tor Helness (born 1957 or 1958), Norwegian professional bridge player
Tor Henning Hamre (born 1979), Norwegian football striker
Tor Hogne Aarøy (born 1977), Norwegian football forward
Tor Isedal (1924–1990), Swedish actor 
Tor Erik Jenstad (born 1956), Norwegian linguist
Tor Johnson (1903–1971), Swedish professional wrestler
Tor Lund (1888–1972), Norwegian Olympic gymnast
Tor Lundsten (1926–1970), Finnish Olympic rower
Tor Mann (1894–1974), Swedish conductor
Tor Miller (born 1994), American musician
Tor Njaa (1912–1944), Norwegian resistance member during World War II
Tor Nessling (1901–1971), Finnish industrialist
Tor Nilsson (1919–1989), Swedish Olympic wrestler
Tor Norberg (1888–1972), Swedish Olympic gymnast
Tor Nørretranders (born 1955), Danish author
Tor Oftedal (1925–1980), Norwegian politician
Tor Ole Skullerud (born 1970), Norwegian football manager and former player
Tor Ørvig (1916–1994), Norwegian-born Swedish paleontologist
Tor Richter (1938–2010), Norwegian Olympic shooter
Tor Seidler (born 1952), American author
Tor Skeie (born 1965), Norwegian Olympic cross-country skier
Tor Sørnes (1925–2017), Norwegian inventor 
Tor Stokke (1928–2003), Norwegian actor
Tor-Arne Strøm (born 1952), Norwegian politician
Tor Svendsberget (born 1947), Norwegian Olympic biathlon competitor 
Tor Torgersen (1928–2020), Norwegian Olympic runner
Tor Ulven (1953–1995), Norwegian poet
Tor Wahlman (1878–1954), Swedish military commander

See also

Tó, nicknames
Ton (given name)